In the mathematical theory of special functions, the Pochhammer k-symbol and the k-gamma function, introduced by Rafael Díaz and Eddy Pariguan  are generalizations of the Pochhammer symbol and gamma function. They differ from the Pochhammer symbol and gamma function in that they can be related to a general arithmetic progression in the same manner as those are related to the sequence of consecutive integers.

Definition
The Pochhammer k-symbol (x)n,k is defined as

 

and the k-gamma function Γk, with k > 0, is defined as

 

When k = 1 the standard Pochhammer symbol and gamma function are obtained.

Díaz and Pariguan use these definitions to demonstrate a number of properties of the hypergeometric function. Although Díaz and Pariguan restrict these symbols to k > 0, the Pochhammer k-symbol as they define it is well-defined for all real k, and for negative k gives the falling factorial, while for k = 0 it reduces to the power xn.

The Díaz and Pariguan paper does not address the many analogies between the Pochhammer k-symbol and the power function, such as the fact that the binomial theorem can be extended to Pochhammer k-symbols. It is true, however, that many equations involving the power function xn continue to hold when xn is replaced by (x)n,k.

Continued Fractions, Congruences, and Finite Difference Equations 

in the form of the next infinite continued fraction expansion given by

The rational  convergent function, to the full generating function for these products expanded by the last equation is given by

The rationality of the  convergent functions for all , combined with known enumerative properties of the J-fraction expansions, imply the following finite difference equations both exactly generating  for all , and generating the symbol modulo  for some fixed integer :

The rationality of  also implies the next exact expansions of these products given by

where the formula is expanded in terms of the special zeros of the Laguerre polynomials, or equivalently, of the confluent hypergeometric function, defined as the finite (ordered) set

and where  denotes the partial fraction decomposition of the rational  convergent function.

Additionally, since the denominator convergent functions, are expanded exactly through the Laguerre polynomials as above, we can exactly generate the Pochhammer k-symbol as the series coefficients

for any prescribed integer .

Special Cases

Special cases of the Pochhammer k-symbol, correspond to the following special cases of the falling and rising factorials, including the Pochhammer symbol, and the generalized cases of the multiple factorial functions (multifactorial functions), or the -factorial functions studied in the last two references by Schmidt:

 The Pochhammer symbol, or rising factorial function:  
 The falling factorial function:  
 The single factorial function:  
 The double factorial function:  

References

Gamma and related functions
Factorial and binomial topics